Sibyll-Anka Klotz (born 1961, in Berlin) is a German politician and member of Alliance '90/The Greens in the parliament of Berlin.

Klotz studied philosophy at the Humboldt University of Berlin in Berlin.

Since 1991 Klotz has been member of the parliament in Berlin until 2006. Klotz lives with her daughter, and she lives openly as a lesbian.

Notes 

1961 births
Living people
Alliance 90/The Greens politicians
Women members of State Parliaments in Germany
LGBT legislators in Germany
Humboldt University of Berlin alumni
Members of the Abgeordnetenhaus of Berlin
20th-century German women politicians
21st-century German women politicians